Sughd Province ( | ) is one of the four administrative divisions and one of the three provinces ( | ) that make up Tajikistan. Centered in the historical Sogdiana, it is located in the northwest of the country, with an area of some 25,400 square kilometers and a population of 2,707,300 (2020 estimate), up from 2,233,550 according to the 2010 census and 1,871,979 in 2000. The capital is Khujand. The Province's ethnic composition in 2010 was 84% Tajik, 14.8% Uzbek, 0.6% Kyrgyz, 0.4% Russian and 0.1% Tatar.

The province shares a border with the Jizzakh, Namangan, Samarkand and Fergana regions of Uzbekistan, and the Osh and Batken regions of Kyrgyzstan. The Syr Darya river flows through it. It contains the Akash Massif and Mogoltau Massif Important Bird Areas. Sughd is separated from the rest of Tajikistan by the Gissar Range (passes may be closed in winter). The southern part of the region is the east-west valley of the upper Zarafshan River. North, over the Turkestan Range, is the Ferghana Valley. The region has 29% of Tajikistan's population and one-third of its arable land. It produces two-thirds of the country's GDP.

Economy
The economy of Sughd has been growing steadily since 2000, at the average rate of 13.2% in 2008 and 13.3% in 2009.  In 2009, farming, trade and industrial production contributed 28.2%, 25.8% and 14.0% to the GRP (gross regional product) of Sughd, respectively. Since 2000, the output of industrial production increased two-fold, at an average annual growth rate of 5–8%.

A free economic zone has been established in the region called Sughd Free Economic Zone.

Demographics

Cities
Sughd province counts the following 8 district-level cities (with population estimate as of 2020): 
 Buston (Chkalovsk) (34,000)
 Guliston (Kayrakkum) (18,000)
 Isfara (51,700)
 Istaravshan (Ura-Tyube) (65,600)
 Istiqlol (Taboshar) (17,600)
 Khujand (Leninabad) (183,600)
 Konibodom (52,500)
 Panjakent (43,300)

Districts
Furthermore, several cities (shahr) also cover other towns (shahrak) and rural localities. These are listed under "city districts".

Districts of Sughd
Asht District
Ayni District
Devashtich District
Ghafurov District
Kuhistoni Mastchoh District
Mastchoh District
Spitamen District
Jabbor Rasulov District
Shahriston District
Zafarobod District

City districts
Buston
Isfara
Istaravshan
Konibodom
Panjakent

See also
 Yaghnobi people
 Yagnob Valley
 Extreme points of Tajikistan

References

Further reading
 reprinted from the 1923 edition, published by the Royal Asiatic Society .

External links
 citypopulation.de
 Official Website of the Free Economic Zone of Sughd

Sughd Region
Regions of Tajikistan